Necrophilus pettiti, the small scavenger beetle, is a species of primitive carrion beetle in the family Agyrtidae. It is found in North America.

References

Further reading

 

Staphylinoidea
Articles created by Qbugbot
Beetles described in 1880